John Cameron Cullen (born 14 September 1937) is a former field hockey player from New Zealand. He competed at the 1960 Summer Olympics and the 1964 Summer Olympics.

References

External links
 

1937 births
Living people
New Zealand male field hockey players
Olympic field hockey players of New Zealand
Field hockey players at the 1960 Summer Olympics
Field hockey players at the 1964 Summer Olympics
Sportspeople from Greymouth